Phoo Action is a BBC Three 60 minute TV pilot, one of six drama pilots that were transmitted in early 2008, and was first broadcast on 12 February 2008 at 21:00 UTC. Phoo Action is based on the Jamie Hewlett-created comic strip Get the Freebies, which ran in The Face from June 1996 to June 1997. It stars Jaime Winstone as Whitey Action, Carl Weathers as Police Chief Benjamin "Ben" Benson and Eddie Shin as Terry Phoo.

Audience figures were reported at 232,000, 105,000 fewer than the average for the time slot, with a proportionately lower audience share.

A six-part series was commissioned to begin shooting later in 2008 for broadcast in 2009. However, just before production was due to begin the BBC announced that the series was cancelled.

The show is set from the perspective of the disaffected teenage female protagonist, Whitey Action, who joins together with tough guy kung-fu cop Terry Phoo to form a dubious crime-fighting duo who thwart many mutant miscreants of The Freebies Gang on the streets of London in 2012.

The screen adaptation was written by Matthew Enriquez Wakeham, Jessica Hynes and Peter Martin, and directed by Euros Lyn.

Production began in September 2007 at a number of Glasgow locations. Some scenes were shot inside the main studio at BBC Scotland's Pacific Quay Studios.

Plot
Whitey Action is daughter of Ben Benson, the New Yorker Chief of the London police. When The Queen is killed by a gang of mutants, known as The Freebies, Whitey guesses they are behind the murder while her father's forces focus their attentions on a single 'a mutant insurgent' suspect. Terry Phoo, a highly trained combat cop from the Hong Kong JKD police force is called in by Benson's superior, Lord Rothwell, as he is supposedly an expert at fighting mutants. However, his investigative skills leave much to be desired.

The Freebies are castigated by a mysterious group of sinister characters known as the Star Chamber for killing the Queen as they were supposed to mutate her, not murder her. The Star Chamber give the Freebies one last chance, demanding that William is mutated before he is crowned. While at a party in the Freebies nightclub, Whitey sees Princes William and Harry being led off by the Freebies, and she causes a big scene, preventing them from being captured but getting herself arrested by Terry Phoo. Convincing him that she is a special agent, he takes her to his hotel room, where, while looking for chocolate, she finds a case containing 'the Buddha's loincloth that transforms into a pair of hotpants, which she immediately tries on. Phoo is rather shocked by this, especially when she pulls a giant chocolate egg out of them and the legend of a 'Chosen One' who is destined to use their power is revealed. Whitey can pull anything she desires from the pants and Terry decides this means that she is the Chosen One.

Together Phoo and Action save the Princes from the evil plot to mutate them, and the subsequent plot to set the lead mutant, Jimmy Freebie, on the throne. The story ends, however, with William beginning to mutate as he is crowned, the Star Chamber seem to have won this battle despite the Freebies bungling and Phoo Action's best efforts.

Reception
On Saturday, 8 September, before principal photography began, John Patterson of The Guardian, writing in 'The Guide' (a weekly listings magazine), placed Phoo Action at number 13 in his list of '50 Must See Shows' of Autumn.

On transmission Phoo Action polarized the UK's  TV critics' opinion. The Daily Telegraph'''s Michael Deacon hated it, writing - "BBC3 has had a revamp. Judging by Phoo Action, though, the channel remains unwavering in its commitment to diabolical television,". Whereas The Times' Andrew Billen loved it "to an almost indecent degree". Writing in The Independent newspaper on Sunday, 17 February 2008 in a review entitled "Lily Allen and Friends, BBC3; Phoo Action, BBC3; Skins, E4; Attila the Hun, BBC1", Hermione Eyre stated the opinion that 'BBC3 struck gold with Phoo Action, a cult comedy in the making'.

Vehicles

The 'Phoo Mobile' is a Napiersport 'SuperStratos' Corse, which is a replica of the Lancia Stratos HF. The Freebies vehicle is a GP Mk2 Beach Buggy, copied from the Meyers Manx and based on a Volkswagen Beetle. During filming the car was only pushed around as the exhausts were too loud for the sound editor to cope with.

Awards
The pilot was scheduled as part of the 'Best Pilots' section, at the second annual Rome TV festival, 'Roma Fiction Fest', which took place from the 7 – 12 July 2008. Phoo Action writer Mat Wakeham was in Rome to explain the thinking behind his unique pilot.Phoo Action won the Lloyds TSB Bafta Scotland award for best television drama, beating Fiona's Story Directed by Adrian Shergold, Produced by David Boulter by BBC Scotland for BBC ONE.Daily Express Monday 10 November 2008 

Cancellation
On 14 November 2008 BBC Scotland notified BECTU of the decision to cancel production of Phoo Action. BECTU Scottish Organiser, Paul McManus was quoted as saying, "Naturally everyone at BBC Scotland and at BECTU are disappointed that the commission has been withdrawn. This was in marked contrast to the BBC's statement released 14 February 2008, which read "We really believe in the originality and boldness of Phoo Action... It's fantastic news that the work of Jamie Hewlett and the rest of the crew will be back on the channel." The cost of cutting the show, which was due to start filming in Dumbarton late November 2008, is reported to be approximately £500,000 in contract payments.

However, in an official statement regarding the cancellation, BBC3 was said to be looking into whether or not Phoo Action'' may come back in another form in the future.

References

External links

 willfield.tv Art Director and Designer - Production designer for Phoo Action
SFX Magazine News Piece - Press clipping on official Gorillaz fan site.
BBC3 Press Pack - Interviews with the creators and the stars of Phoo Action.
Napiersport SuperStratos Corse

Television shows set in London
Television pilots not picked up as a series
2008 television specials
British comedy-drama television shows
Films based on British comics
Films based on comic strips
Television shows based on comic strips
Live-action films based on comics
Films directed by Euros Lyn